Daniel Sueiro (1931-1986) was a Spanish author and journalist. He was born in La Coruña and died in Madrid. He is best known for two of his ten books: the short story collection Los conspiradores (1959) which won the Premio Nacional de Literatura, and the novel Corte de corteza (1969) which won the Premio Alfaguara.

As a journalist he wrote for the Spanish publications "Arriba" and "Pueblo."

References

Spanish novelists
Spanish male short story writers
Spanish short story writers
Spanish male novelists
20th-century Spanish writers
20th-century Spanish male writers
20th-century Spanish novelists
People from A Coruña
1931 births
1986 deaths
20th-century short story writers